The 2014 European Cup was an international rugby league football tournament. The tournament took place in England, Wales, France, Ireland and Scotland between 17 October and 2 November. It was announced beforehand that the winner of the tournament would qualify for the 2016 Four Nations, and also that if Ireland or Wales won tournament, they will automatically qualify for the 2017 Rugby League World Cup (due to the World Cup qualifying tournament taking place at the same time as the 2016 Four Nations). France and Scotland had already qualified for that tournament.

The England Knights were defending Champions but they did not compete in this year's tournament. Four teams competed in the 2014 event; Scotland, Ireland, France and Wales. Scotland were crowned champions on points differential, and subsequently won their first European Cup title. Scotland therefore qualified for the 2016 Four Nations, which will be their first appearance in a Four Nations tournament.

Teams

Squads

France
Head Coach:  Richard Agar

On 3 October, Richard Agar named the following 23 players as part of his squad in preparation for the tournament.
On 7 October, Aaron Wood and Tony Maurel of Toulouse Olympique were called into Richard Agar's squad to replace Morgan Escaré (medical reasons) and Vincent Duport (resting after Super League).

Ireland
Head Coach:  Mark Aston

On 10 October, Mark Aston named the following 29 players as part of a train-on squad in preparation for the tournament.
On 16 October, Mark Aston added Halifax halfback Ben Johnston to his squad for the tournament.
Liam Finn was a late addition for the Irish team. He arrived just in time to play for Ireland in their final tournament match against Wales.

Scotland
Head Coach:  Steve McCormack

On 10 October, Steve McCormack named the following 31 players as part of a train-on squad in preparation for the tournament.

Wales
Head Coach:  John Kear

On 7 October, John Kear named the following 25 players as part of his squad in preparation for the tournament.
On 9 October, John Kear brought in four new players to the team to add to his train-on squad after withdrawals from Garreth Carvell and Rob Massam. Carvell withdrew due to injury while Massam cited work commitments. The four new players Kear brought in are: Tom Hughes, Morgan Evans, Lewis Reece and Owain Griffiths.

Venues 
The games will be played at the following venues in England, Ireland, France, Scotland and Wales.

Standings

Fixtures

Round 1

Round 2

Round 3

Matches details
All times are local: UTC+0/GMT in English venues. UTC+1/CET in French venues. UTC+0/WET in Irish venues. UTC+0/GMT in Welsh venues. UTC+0/GMT in Scottish venues.

Scotland vs Wales

Ireland vs France

Ireland vs Scotland

France vs Wales

Scotland vs France

Wales vs Ireland

References

European Nations Cup
European Cup
European Cup
European Cup
European Cup
European Cup
European Cup
European Cup